Walter Stacy Keach Sr. (May 29, 1914 – February 13, 2003), known professionally as Stacy Keach Sr.  was an American actor whose screen career spanned more than five decades.

Biography
Keach was born in Chicago, Illinois. He was of English descent. His career ranged from 1942 to 1997, with more than seventy movie and television appearances. He and his wife, the former Mary Cain Peckham, were members of the Peninsula Players summer theater program during the 1930s.

Keach appeared in a 1955 episode of The Lone Ranger.  Keach also appeared as Sheriff Ben Mason in the 1957 episode "Last Chance" of the  ABC/Warner Brothers western television series, Colt .45. That same year, he was cast as Jed Hammer in the episode "Trail's End" of the ABC/WB western series, Sugarfoot, starring Will Hutchins. Keach was cast in 1957 and 1958 in five episodes of the NBC western series, The Californians as Bill Coleman. He also appeared in several episodes of the series Maverick as various lawmen, including the episode "Ghost Rider" with James Garner.

Keach is probably best known for his role as Carlson in the NBC sitcom, Get Smart. Carlson, a CONTROL scientist, was the inventor of such gadgets as an umbrella rifle (with a high-speed camera in the handle) and edible buttons—a parody of Q, who holds a similar position in the James Bond movies. By the time Keach took the role, however, he was the head of an industrial film company (a position he had held since 1948). Keach eventually gave up the role of Carlson when one too many clients were unable to reach him, and he had to respond, "I've been working in the CONTROL labs."

In 1964 he appeared on Perry Mason in the role of Lt. Gibson in "The Case of the Frightened Fisherman" and in 1965 he again appeared on Perry Mason in the role of the trial court judge in "The Case of the Cheating Chancellor." In 1961, he appeared as Dr. Walter in the very first episode of The Dick Van Dyke Show. In 1974 he appeared in an episode of the James Stewart legal drama Hawkins.

Keach's son, Stacy Keach Jr. (usually billed as "Stacy Keach," exactly like his father), enjoyed an acting career with far greater name recognition than his father's. The younger Keach is perhaps best known for starring in the title role of the Mike Hammer television series in the 1980s and 1990s. Another son, James Keach, an actor, director, and producer, was married to the actress Jane Seymour.

Keach died of congestive heart failure at the age of 88 in Burbank, California and is buried at Forest Lawn Memorial Park (Hollywood Hills).

Filmography

References

External links

1914 births
2003 deaths
Male actors from Chicago
Male actors from Illinois
American male film actors
American male television actors
Male actors from Los Angeles
20th-century American male actors
Burials at Forest Lawn Memorial Park (Hollywood Hills)
American people of English descent
Keach family